is a Japanese actor and voice actor from Tokyo, Japan. He was represented by Sigma Seven and is now a freelancer.

Filmography

Anime television series
Brave Police J-Decker (Edgar Hopkins)
Cyber Team in Akihabara (Cigogne Raspaile)
Gantz (Yoshida)
Highschool! Kimen-gumi (Auzō Sainan)
Mobile Suit Zeta Gundam (Chan Ya)
Muka Muka Paradise (鹿谷葉三)
Soul Eater (Fisher King)
The Transformers (Astrotrain, Cliffjumper, Dashiell Faireborn, *Grimlock, Headstrong, Inferno, Lightspeed, Ligier (Mirage), Mixmaster, Ramhorn, Scavenger, Skydive, Warpath)
Yokoyama Mitsuteru Sangokushi (Xu Shu, Li Su)

OVA
Tenchi Muyo! (Nobeyama)

Anime films
The Transformers: The Movie (Cliffjumper, Grimlock, Astrotrain)

Drama CDs
Aisaresugite Kodoku series 2: Itoshisugita Shifuku (Asakawa's father)

Dubbing
Apollo 13 (Ted)
Donnie Brasco (Pony Canyon edition) (Richie Gazzo (Rocco Sisto))
For Love of the Game (Gus Sinski)
The Ghost Writer (Paul Emmett (Tom Wilkinson))
Goosebumps (Dr. Finley) (Episode: You can't scare me!)
L.A. Law (Stuart Markowitz)
Police Academy (Larvell Jones)
Song of the Sea (Ferry Dan / The Great Seanachaí)
The West Wing (Ron Butterfield)

Tokusatsu
Seijuu Sentai Gingaman (Torbador)

Japanese Voice-Over
Peter Pan's Flight (Pirates Patrick)

References

External links
Takurō Kitagawa's Homepage 
Official agency profile 

1949 births
Living people
Japanese male voice actors
Male voice actors from Tokyo
Place of birth missing (living people)
Sigma Seven voice actors
20th-century Japanese male actors
21st-century Japanese male actors